Zikrin, pronounced Dhikrin, was a Palestinian Arab village in the Hebron Subdistrict, depopulated in the 1948 Palestine War. The entire site is dotted with grottoes and caves, and razed structures.

History
The village was called Kefar Dikrina in Roman times. Geographer, Adolf Neubauer mentions the village as formerly being called Kefar Dhikrin in several Rabbinic sources, including the Babylonian Talmud. Neubauer cites one of the sources, saying that the village's name is derived from the fact that the womenfolk of the village bare only male children (hence: dikhra = male). According to Lamentations Rabbah, the region of Kefar Dhikrin was one of the most densely populated areas of the country at that time. These sources mostly date back to the 3rd and 4th centuries CE.

In 1479, it was mentioned by Tucher of Nurnberg, who travelled from Bethlehem to Gaza and lodged at Zikrin. He noted cisterns here.

Ottoman era
In 1596, Zikrin was part of the Ottoman Empire, nahiya (subdistrict) of Gaza under the Gaza Sanjak, with a population of 40 Muslim households, an estimated 220 persons. They  paid a fixed tax rate of 25% on a number of products, including wheat, barley, sesame and fruits, and on vineyards; a total of 8,000  akçe. 

In 1838, Edward Robinson described Dhikrin as a "large" Muslim village, located in the Gaza district.

In 1863 Victor Guérin visited, and found here a village with about 600 inhabitants. On the west side of the village there were as many as 40 cisterns. Guérin toured the village with the village Sheikh, whom he described as a "tall, young and intelligent" man, whose father was the Sheikh of Bayt Jibrin, and whose uncles were the same in Tell es-Safi and 'Ajjur.
Socin found from an Ottoman village list of about 1870 that Zikrin had 38 houses and a population of 101, though the population count included men, only. Hartmann found that Zikrin had 60 houses.

In 1883, the PEF's Survey of Western Palestine described Zikrin as being a stone village with gardens and "numerous" water wells.

In 1896 the population of  Dikrin  was estimated to be about 609 persons.

British Mandate era
In the 1922 census of Palestine conducted by the British Mandate authorities, Zekrin had a population of 693, all Muslims, increasing in the 1931 census to 726, still all Muslim, in a total of 181 houses.

The modern village had an elementary school, and a few shops. The villagers, who were Muslim, were farmers. 

In 1945 statistics, it had a population of 960, all Muslims, and a total land area of 17,195 dunams. In 1944/45  of village land was planted with cereals, while 63 dunams were built-up (urban) areas.

1948 and aftermath
On 6 August 1948, in the middle of the official  Second truce, two squads from the 53rd Battalion of the Givati Brigade raided Zikrin, lobbing grenades and torching three or four houses. About 10 adult males, two children and one woman were killed in the village, according to IDF sources. The last three were killed accidentally, according to the report, while IDF suffered one soldier "slightly injured."

Zikrin was finally depopulated on 22–23 October 1948 during the third stage of Operation Yoav under the command of Yigal Allon. According to Morris, most of the villagers fled before the troops arrived, those who remained were expelled eastwards. According to Morris, Yigal Allon was so successful in completely driving out the local population during Operation Yo'av, that the villagers found it almost impossible to "reinfiltrate" to their old villages, as there was no longer any local Arab population to help them resettle. During a military "sweep" of the villages in early 1949, they found most villages empty. In Zikrin it is reported that the troops found "two Arabs" who "managed to escape."

Following the war, the area was incorporated into the State of Israel and the land that had belonged to the village was left undeveloped. Kibbutz Beit Nir is about 3 km south of the village site.

The Palestinian historian Walid Khalidi described the village site in 1992 as being "overgrown with tall weeds, scrub, and other wild vegetation, containing a number of olive and carob trees. Truncated stone terraces, partially overgrown with cactuses, further marked the site. Some of the surrounding lands was cultivated by Israeli farmers for wheat, and the rest used as rangeland."

Gallery

References

Bibliography

External links
Welcome To Thikrin
Zikrin,  Zochrot
Survey of Western Palestine, Map 20: IAA, Wikimedia commons 
Zikrin, from the Khalil Sakakini Cultural Center

Arab villages depopulated during the 1948 Arab–Israeli War
District of Hebron
Talmud places